Karin Housley (née Locke; born January 20, 1964) is an American politician, businesswoman, and member of the Minnesota Senate. A Republican, she represents Forest Lake, Stillwater, and the surrounding St. Croix Valley. Housley was the Republican nominee in Minnesota's 2018 special election for the United States Senate.

Early life, education, and career
Housley was born and raised in South St. Paul, Minnesota. She graduated from South St. Paul High School in 1982 and briefly attended Augsburg College before moving to Buffalo, New York, after her high school sweetheart, Phil Housley, was drafted by the Buffalo Sabres. She enrolled at the State University of New York at Buffalo, graduating in 1987 with a B.A. in communication studies. Housley then worked as a news producer for WGRZ and WKBW in Buffalo until 1991.

Minnesota Senate
Housley has represented Forest Lake, Stillwater, and communities along the St. Croix Valley in the Minnesota Senate since 2013. As a state senator, she is best known for her work on issues related to aging and long-term care and veterans. Housley was instrumental in creating the first Minnesota Senate committee on aging, which she chaired. In 2019, Housley authored "landmark" legislation to provide enhanced protections for elderly and vulnerable adults in senior care facilities and licensed assisted living facilities in Minnesota for the first time.

Housley was selected by her colleagues to serve as an assistant majority leader in both the 91st and 92nd sessions of the Minnesota Legislature.

Political campaigns 
In her first campaign for public office, Housley ran for the Minnesota Senate in 2010 and narrowly lost to DFL incumbent Katie Sieben. After redistricting placed Housley's residence in a new district, she was elected to the Senate in 2012, defeating her opponent by 1% of the vote. She was reelected in 2016 by more than 20 points. Housley was reelected again in 2020 and 2022.

In 2014, Housley was selected by Republican gubernatorial candidate Scott Honour, a businessman from Orono, to be his candidate for lieutenant governor of Minnesota. They lost the 2014 Republican primary to Jeff Johnson.

In December 2017, Housley announced her candidacy for the Republican nomination in the 2018 special election for United States Senate. The seat was vacated by Al Franken, who resigned amid allegations of sexual misconduct. Governor Mark Dayton appointed Lieutenant Governor Tina Smith to fill the vacancy, and Smith announced her candidacy for election to the seat. Housley won the Republican primary and lost to Smith in the general election. Housley was criticized during the campaign for a 2009 Facebook post in which she made a comparison between then-First Lady Michelle Obama's posture and Ronald Reagan's character in Bedtime for Bonzo.

In March 2019, Housley registered a political action committee to assist conservative candidates running for office in Minnesota, fueling speculation that she would run for the same U.S. Senate seat again in 2020. She ultimately decided against it, instead announcing she would run for reelection to the Minnesota Senate.

Personal life
After living in Buffalo, Winnipeg, St. Louis, Calgary, New Jersey, Washington, D.C., Chicago, Toronto, and Phoenix during Phil's National Hockey League career, the Housleys moved back to Minnesota in 2003. Karin and Phil have four children, all graduates of Stillwater Area High School, and four grandchildren. They reside in Stillwater, where Housley also owns a real estate business.

Electoral history

References

External links

Senator Karin Housley official Minnesota Senate website
Karin Housley for Senate official campaign website

Senator Karin Housley official Minnesota Senate Republican Caucus website

1964 births
21st-century American women politicians
Candidates in the 2018 United States Senate elections
Augsburg University alumni
Living people
Republican Party Minnesota state senators
People from South St. Paul, Minnesota
University at Buffalo alumni
Women state legislators in Minnesota
21st-century American politicians